HMS Comet was launched in 1807 as a Thais-class fireship of the Royal Navy. In 1808 the class were re-rated as sloops, and in 1811 they were re-rated as 20-gun sixth rates. Comet participated in one action that resulted in her crew being awarded the Naval General Service Medal, and some other actions and captures. The Navy sold her in 1815. In 1816 she became an East Indiaman, sailing under a license from the British East India Company (EIC). She sailed between the United Kingdom and Ceylon. It was on one of these journeys that she was wrecked on Cole House Point on the River Thames on 9 August 1828.

Royal Navy
Commander Cuthbert Featherstone Daly commissioned Comet in January 1808 for the Channel. 
  
In June 1808  and Comet went to St Andero to assist Spanish loyalists and bring off any British subjects. On 21 June boats from Cossack and Comet landed seamen and Royal Marines who spiked the guns of Fort St Salvador de Ano and Fort Sedra, near the town of St Andero, to prevent them falling into French hands. They also blew up two magazines, during which Captain Daly of Comet and Lieutenant Read of the Marines were injured when one of the magazines blew up.

On 11 August they encountered Comet. The French, under orders to avoid combat, attempted to escape. Diligente out-sailed her two consorts. Comet caught up with the two laggards, with Espiègle ahead. Comet then engaged Sylphe, capturing her near the Île d'Yeu.

In the 20-minute engagement, the French suffered seven men killed and five wounded, most severely; the British had no casualties. This action earned Daly his promotion to Post-captain, dated 18 August. In 1847 the Admiralty awarded the Naval General Service Medal to the three surviving claimants from the action. The British took Sylphe into Royal Navy service as HMS Seagull.

Captain Richard Henry Muddle replaced Daly in August 1808. He sailed to Newfoundland on 17 April 1809, and again in 1810-1811. She overwintered there in and then in spring 1811 patrolled the Grand Banks. In July she escorted a convoy back to England in July. In 1811 Commander William Shepheard replaced Muddle.

Captain Shepheard returned to England and was promoted to post captain on 1 February 1812.

On 10 February 1812 Comet was reclassed as a sixth rate under the command of Captain George Blamey. He sailed Comet for Newfoundland on 25 May 1812.

On 10 February  1813 Comet captured Hero, of 120 ton (bm) and nine men. Hero was bound to Lisbon, from Wilmington with a cargo of flour and rice.

On 23 April 1813 Comet again sailed for Newfoundland. She was paid off at Sheerness in December 1814 and went into ordinary.

Disposal: The "Principal Officers and Commissioners of His Majesty's Navy" offered "Comet, sloop, of 427 tons", "Lying at Sheerness" for sale on 31 August 1815. The Navy sold Comet on 12 October 1815 for £1,400. She became the mercantile Alexander.

Merchantman
Alexander underwent a through repair in 1816.

Alexander was first listed in Lloyd's Register (LR) in 1816. (There is no volume of LR for 1817 available on line; possibly no such volume was published.)

In 1813 the EIC had lost its monopoly on the trade between India and Britain. British ships were then free to sail to India, the Indian Ocean, and South-East Asia under a license from the EIC. Alexanders wners applied for a licence on 26 January 1816, and received it on 30 January.

On 15 April 1818, Alexander, Surflen, master, was returning to London when at  she spoke , Darney, master, which was returning from whaling at Desolation Island.

On 14 November Alexander, Surflen, master, arrived at Mauritius, and on the next day sailed for Ceylon. On 3 January 1820 she arrived at Columbo, Ceylon. She left Ceylon for London on 25 January. In mid-August she arrived back at Liverpool. On 6 December she was at Gravesend, sailing for "Bombay, &c.". On 21 November 1821 Alexander, Surflen, master, arrived Portsmouth from Mauritius and Cape of Good Hope.

On 13 May 1822 Alexander, Surflen, master sailed from London via Portsmouth for Madeira, Mauritius, and Ceylon. She arrived in Mauritius on 17 August and left for Columbo on 3 September. She arrived back at Gravesend on 11 March 1823 from Ceylon. She had left Mauritius on 9 December 1822 and had been at Saint Helena between 9 December 1822 and 18 January 1823.

On his return, Captain Surflen left Alexander to become master of a larger ship, which had been launched in Calcutta in 1816 and sold in London in April 1823.

Loss
 On 6 April 1828 Alexander sailed from Colombo, Ceylon, calling at Mauritius on 2 May, and arriving in London on 6 August. The following day, she was driven ashore and was wrecked at Cole House Point near Gravesend on the River Thames. The cargo was lost.

Notes

Citation

References

External links
 

1807 ships
Fireships of the Royal Navy
Sloops of the Royal Navy
Sixth rates of the Royal Navy
Age of Sail merchant ships
Merchant ships of the United Kingdom
Maritime incidents in August 1828